Pleuropogon californicus is a species of grass known by the common name annual semaphoregrass. It is endemic to northern California, where it grows in moist woodland and forest habitat, including redwood forests and nearby wetlands.

Description

The inflorescence bears widely spaced narrowly cylindrical spikelets which hang sideways off the stem, resembling semaphore signals. Each spikelet may be up to 5 centimeters long and may contain 20 flowers.

External links

Jepson Manual Treatment: Pleuropogon californicus
USDA Plants Profile
Pleuropogon californicus — U.C. Photo gallery

Pooideae
Native grasses of California
Endemic flora of California
Bunchgrasses of North America
Flora of the Sierra Nevada (United States)
Natural history of the California Coast Ranges
Natural history of the San Francisco Bay Area
Flora without expected TNC conservation status